Pupoides is a genus of land snails, terrestrial gastropod mollusks in the family Pupillidae.

Species 
Species within the genus Pupoides include:
 Pupoides albilabris (C. B. Adams, 1841) - white-lip dagger
 Pupoides coenopictus (Hutton, 1834)
 Pupoides hordaceus (Gabb, 1866) - ribbed dagger
 Pupoides inornatus Vanatta, 1915 - Rocky Mountain dagger
 Pupoides marginatus
 Pupoides marginatus nitidulus (Pfeiffer, 1839) - this is the only member of the family Pupillidae in Cuba.
 Pupoides modicus (Gould, 1848) - island dagger

References 

 Thompson F.G. (2011) An annotated checklist and bibliography of the land and freshwater snails of México and central America. Florida Museum of Natural History, Bulletin 50(1): 1-299.

Pupillidae